U.S. Route 23 (US 23) in the U.S. state of Georgia, is a north–south United States highway that travels from the St. Marys River south-southeast of Folkston to the North Carolina state line, in the northern part of Dillard.

US 23 is signed concurrently with various state highways. It uses SR 4 from Florida to a point north of Alma, SR 15 from Florida to Racepond, SR 23 in Folkston, SR 121 from Folkston to Racepond, SR 520 and SR 38 in Waycross, SR 19 from north of Alma to Lumber City, SR 135 Truck in Hazlehurst, SR 27 from Hazlehurst to Eastman, SR 165 in Chauncey, SR 27 Bus. and SR 117 in Eastman, SR 87 from Eastman to Macon, SR 257 in the Empire area, SR 112 near Cochran, SR 19 from East Macon to the northern part of Macon, SR 540 from East Macon to the eastern part of Macon, SR 11/SR 49 in Macon, SR 87 from Macon to Flovilla, SR 42 from Flovilla to Atlanta, SR 16 and SR 36 in Jackson, SR 138 in the Stockbridge area, SR 10 from Atlanta to Druid Hills, SR 8 from Atlanta to Decatur, SR 155 from Decatur to the Brookhaven–Chamblee line, SR 13 from the Brookhaven–Chamblee line to the Sugar Hill–Buford line, SR 20 within Buford, SR 365 from Buford to east-southeast of Clarkesville, SR 15 from northwest of Cornelia to the North Carolina state line, and SR 2 in Clayton.

Concurrencies of US 23 with U.S. Highways in Georgia are US 1 from Florida to north of Alma, US 301 from Florida to the Folkston–Homeland line, US 82 in Waycross, US 84 in Waycross, US 221 Truck in Hazlehurst, US 341 from Hazlehurst to Eastman, US 129 Alt. from north of Cochran to Macon, US 80 from East Macon to Macon, US 129 in Macon, US 278 from Atlanta to Druid Hills, US 29/78 from Atlanta to Decatur, US 129 in Gainesville, US 441 from northwest of Cornelia to the North Carolina state line, and US 76 in Clayton. Between Buford and Gainesville, it also has a concurrency with Interstate 985 (I-985).

Route description

Entering Georgia with US 1
US 23 enters Georgia from Florida concurrent with US 1/US 301, also designated as SR 4/SR 15, on a bridge over the St. Marys River. In Folkston, the routes have their first encounter with another state route, specifically the western terminus of Georgia State Route 40 at Main Street. On the opposite side of SR 40, Main Street leads to a former Atlantic Coast Line Railroad station, and an extremely popular train-watching site.  North of there SR 23/SR 121 join this already crowded concurrency, and shortly serves as the western terminus for SR 40 Conn. In Homeland, US 301/SR 23 heads northeast at an interchange into the woods of northeastern Charlton County towards Nahunta, Jesup, Claxton, Statesboro, and Sylvania, while US 23 continues to the northwest in the concurrency with US 1/SR 4/SR 15/SR 121, but not before both lanes run over bridges over the CSX Nahunta Subdivision, which runs along US 301 through Jesup. After Homeland, US 1/23 and SRs 4/15/121 run through sparse communities such as Uptonville,  and then Mattox, where another railroad line from Folkston runs along the west side and both pass through another community named Cypress Siding. Later in Racepond, SR 15/SR 121, branch off to the northeast, while the US 1/23/SR 4 concurrency remains running to the northwest, and then crossing into Ware County along the edge of the Ware-Brantley County Line. From this point on the road is named Jacksonville Highway. The Brantley County line turns straight north somewhere in Dixon Memorial State Forest. After leaving the forest, the road starts to move away from the tracks before the intersection of Georgia State Route 177 and the gateway to Okefenokee Swamp Park.

Right after a Georgia State Trooper barracks and DMV office, the routes officially enter Waycross, as the run between two local motels. Passing by some automotive dealerships, hotels, fast foot restaurants and other commercial development, the road approaches US 82/SR 520 and then turns west onto a concurrency with these routes while US BUS 1/23/SR BUS 4 continues northwest along Memorial Drive. After running along a bridge over the CSX Jesup Subdivision, US 84/SR 38 also joins this concurrency at McDonald Street, but not before crossing another railroad bridge over the CSX Fitzgerald Subdivision, more than a block away to the west. The concurrency ends at Victory Drive and the southwest corner is the site of Waycross College. West of the city limits, US 82 becomes a divided highway as it takes US 1/23 from west to northwest as they cross Georgia State Route 122, and later crosses another bridge over the second railroad line from Waycross Junction. The road starts to curve west, and before reaching Waresboro, US 1/23 breaks away from US 82 onto a bypass across from a local street named Fulford Road. Using a former segment of Fulford Road and later Scapa Road, the bypass winds through forestland and some farmland west of northern Deenwood and northwest of Waycross. The bypass ends at the northern terminus of US BUS 1/23/SR BUS 4, then rejoins its former segment along Alma Highway to approach a series of bridges over Cox Creek and then over the Satilla River. After this, it passes through a small community called Dixie Union, where it intersects a local road named Telmore-Dixie Union Road to the west and Dixie Union Road to the east. North of Bickley Highway, the road curves to the north-northeast and winds around a former segment so that it can go over a pair of bridges over another railroad line. Right after the Ware-Bacon County line and then the intersection of Old Alma-Waycross Highway/Jamestown Road, the road runs over a pair of bridges over Little Hurricane Creek before the intersection with Plant Road where it curves from the northeast to the north-northwest.

The divided highway, which at some point gained the name South Pierce Street, ends at Dogwood Avenue, replaced by a four-lane undivided highway with a center-left turn lane; it enters Alma after it passes by the Bacon County High School and Middle School property. Immediately after the intersection with Radio Station Road, Georgia Alternate Route 4 branches off to the northwest onto South Dixon Street, while the main road curves slightly to the northeast. Nearly several blocks after this the US 1/23/SR 4 has a major intersection with Georgia State Route 32 (16th Street), and South Pierce Street becomes North Pierce Street. Among the structures along this segment, it passes by a former school converted into a welcome center, then curves to the northwest after Sixth Street. After passing through the preserved land around the Bear Branch of Hurricane Creek, the road encounters the northern terminus of SR 4 Alt. at North Dixon Street, replacing the straight north trajectory of the business route. US 1/23/SR 4 turns from straight north to north-northeast where it leaves the Alma City Limits as it crosses the Curtis Lee Marion Bridge over the Hurricane Creek, evidently resuming its former name as Alma Highway, then curves straight north again to cross the Jauquion R. "Rab" Tanner Bridge over the Hurricane Creek Overflow, and remains that way for the next . After the road becomes a divided highway again north of a dirt road named Tadpole Trail, US 23 splits off to the northwest onto Georgia State Route 19, while US 1/SR 4 continues in a northeasterly direction, and crosses into Appling County. Alma Highway follows the US 23/SR 19 designation, in fact the former right-of-way for Alma Highway can be found in the back yard of a gas station/convenience store named for the split between the two routes.

North from Bacon County
Throughout much of this segment, US 23/SR 19 has standard rural Georgia surroundings, with its mix of wooded areas, local farmland, and intersections with mostly dirt roads. These routes also cross the Bacon-Appling County line, and then the Appling-Jeff Davis County Line. The routes return to the Jeff Davis County again where they later they cross a bridge over the Little Satilla Creek, and another bridge over the Big Satilla Creek before entering community of Satilla. No major intersections exist within this community, and very few other paved roads exist. Nearing Hazlehurst, Alma Highway continues into the southern terminus of US 23 Bus./SR 135 Conn., while US 23/SR 19 turns right onto Larry Contos Boulevard, taking part of US Truck Route 221/SR 135 Truck with it. From there, it passes by a power plant on the west side. The route officially enters the Hazlehurst City Limits between Currie Street and a railroad crossing for a former Southern Railway line (now the Norfolk Southern Railway's Brunswick District). Larry Contos Boulevard ends at US 341/SR 27 (a divided four-lane highway Designated the Golden Isles Parkway), and US 23/SR 19 turns northwest along this route. The first notable site along this segment is the combined Hazlehurst Fire Department and the Hazlehurst — Jeff Davis County Chamber of Commerce building on the northeast corner of Oak Street. Two block later, it crosses another railroad line just east of Walnut Street. Two blocks after this, it intersects with northbound US 221 and the north end of US BUS 23, and the truck routes for US 221/SR 135 officially comes to an end. US 23/341 and northbound US 221 run for one block until the routes curve to the north at East Coffee (SR 19 Conn.) and West Jamar Streets, and northbound US 221 finally joins the southbound road once again at North Tallahassee Street, while southbound US 221 continues southbound along South Tallahassee Street.

The routes cross the Jeff Davis-Telfair County line by passing over the Dr. C. R. Youmans Memorial Bridge over the Ocmulgee River where it enters Lumber City. Georgia State Route 19 leaves the US 23/341/SR 27 concurrency at Victory Boulevard. Shortly afterwards at Main Street, it has another intersection with the southeastern terminus of Georgia State Route 117, across from Burns Street. The routes then curve more towards the west as they cross the same railroad line that US 23 encountered near the Hazlehurst border. Curving back to the northwest, it becomes a divided highway once again. Beyond that, it winds through farms and forestland of Georgia with few landmarks of any significance other than intersections with former Georgia State Route 134, and later Georgia State Route 149. West of SR 149 is the Talmadge Home (a.k.a. "Sugar Creek Plantation"), which is now a restaurant and catering hall. It also passes the Telfair County Elementary School, and then the broadcast home of WYSC and WYIS. The divided highway ends at a Husqvarna plant along the border of McRae where after the intersection with East Avenue, the route later splits onto a pair of one way streets. Though the northbound lanes are still considered part of the Golden Isles Parkway, street name signs still refer to it as Railroad Street, as they do to the local street on the opposite side of the railroad tracks. Though the historic Telfair County Courthouse and Jail can be seen from both northbound and southbound US 23/341, it is officially located only on the southbound street. The northbound street passes a former Southern Railway station across from an agricultural seed and feed store at the intersection of Second Street, which has a former grade crossing that was closed, and then intersects with US 280-319-441. The one-way split ends between Fifth and Sixth Avenues. US 23/341/SR 27 crosses the former McRae-Helena border at a shopping center called the Telfair Plaza. A few blocks after this, it encounters a former Seaboard Air Line railroad crossing west of Forsyth Avenue. The divided highway resumes just west of the city limits.

After the intersection with Red Barn Road (Telfair CR 88), US 23/341/SR 27 crosses the Telfair-Dodge County line through Achord, where it curves more to the west. The road for which the community was named is a dirt road that only has access to the northwest-bound lanes. The first official median opening within the community is at Clarence Brown Road, for a local lumber yard. Little else exists northwest of there besides random private houses, and churches, one of which contains a cemetery in its back yard along the railroad tracks. The divided highway briefly ends again as the routes enter Chauncey, where it has a short wrong-way concurrency with Georgia State Route 165, and becomes a divided highway once again at the Langdale Forest Products driveway. US 23/341/SR 27 tries to curve more towards the north but still remains northwest as it eventually enters Eastman where US 23 leaves US 341 onto two-lane wide College Street, but has another concurrency with US BUS 341 and SR 27 Business. Here the road passes an open-air flea market at the intersections of Pine Ridge Road and Industrial Boulevard, and then a local pond named Harrell Pond. After the routes shift from College Street to Oak Street, it gets a new concurrency with SR 87/117 at Griffin Avenue, but shortly at SR 46 (Fifth Avenue), SR 117 leaves eastbound, while US BUS 341/SR BUS 27 leaves westbound. US 23 and SR 87 will continue to overlap each other throughout most of Central Georgia. North of a cemetery near the city limits, the name of the street changes from Oak Street to Eastman Cochran Highway, but still remains two lanes wide from that point on, although construction is underway on widening the road to a four-lane highway (partially divided, partially with a center turn lane) between SR 87 Conn. north of Eastman to the community of Empire at the Dodge-Bleckley County line. At Empire the route intersects SR 257 (including a brief wrong-way concurrency) and becomes a four-lane highway with a continuous center turn lane.

Cochran area through Macon
US 23 continues to overlap SR 87 and both routes have auxiliary routes that travel through Cochran. The business route in Cochran is two lanes wide, while the bypass route was widened in 2019 from two lanes to have four lanes and a center turn lane. The northern terminus of US 23 Bus./SR 87 Bus. is also the beginning of the US 129 Alt./SR 112 concurrency. From that point, the center turn lane ends and the route becomes a four-lane undivided highway through the rest of the county and for the next . North of the Cochran area, in Royal, SR 112 leaves to the northeast across from Coley Station Road. US 23/US 129 Alt./SR 87 remains an undivided four-lane highway through the Twiggs County line to the intersection with SR 96 in Tarversville, then narrows down to two lanes for the next . Within this vicinity, US 23/US 129 Alt./SR 87 travels through communities such as Bullard, South Twiggs, Huber, and later Reids with no major intersections, especially as it travels through the Bond Swamp National Wildlife Refuge, and has occasional entrances to the refuge. After traveling between some antenna fields for some Macon-area television and FM radio stations, the highways pass one more entrance to the wildlife refuge before crossing the Twiggs–Bibb County line, and widens to a three and then four-lane undivided highway. In Smithsonia, the highways use the name Ocmulgee East Boulevard, and then become a four-lane divided highway for the first interchange under Interstate 16 (I-16) west of old Camp Wheeler, then travels over the Georgia Central Railway bridges before narrowing back down to an undivided two-lane highway as it travels through East Macon along the western edge of the Macon Downtown Airport. Just after a small power line right of way, the road curves to the right, then turns left as Emery Highway while Ocmulgee East Boulevard becomes SR 87 Conn. leading towards US 80/SR 19/SR 540 and Jeffersonville Road. Emery Highway is later joined by US 80/SR 19/SR 540, and all six highways (US 23/US 80/US 129 Alt./SR 19/SR 87/SR 540) continue to the northwest. Within Macon, they first enter the city limits by traveling beneath a former Central of Georgia Railway bridge, and then travels under a power line right-of-way before crossing a pair of old bridges over Walnut Creek, where it travels along the northern edge of the Ocmulgee National Monument. US 80, SR 87, and SR 540 turn left at Colesium Drive and US 129 Alt. turns right onto northbound Second Street (SR 22), while bi-directional west-to-south and north-to-east turning lanes exist at the southwest corner. US 23 turns left again as Spring Street in a wrong-way concurrency with US 129 at another interchange with I-16, where it instantly crosses the W.L. "Young" Stribling Memorial Bridge (formerly known as the Spring Street Bridge) over the Ocmulgee River, which also includes the Ocmulgee Heritage Trail on the north side and a railroad line on the south side. That concurrency ends when US 23 turns right at Riverside Drive rejoining SR 87, while US 129 turns left. From there, US 23/SR 87 passes by the NRHP-listed Rose Hill Cemetery as it descends towards a bridge over I-75 at the interchange with SR 540 and the western terminus of I-16, but has no connecting ramps to or from either highway. North of that bridge, the road travels along the southwest side of I-75, and this is the only place that US 23 travels west of I-75 until many miles to the north, in Perrysburg, Ohio (near Toledo). Access to the interstate is available from US 23 in this area, though. The first point is from SR 247 whose northern terminus is at exit 167. The next is with Arkwright Road at exit 169. Finally, US 23/SR 87 only has an interchange with I-75 at exit 171 north of Macon, and travels more toward the north, passing by The Shoppes at River Crossing and narrowing down to a two-lane undivided highway, although a long stretch of right-of-way for new northbound lanes can be found along the east side as it travels through the intersection of the northwest end of Arkwright Road and former SR 361. This right-of-way shows up at random moments even as it travels through its last miles within Bibb County.

Metro Macon through Flovilla
US 23/SR 87 briefly curves straight north and enters Monroe County between Wesleyan Drive and Trey Terrace, north of the Brickyard Golf Club. Most of the surroundings along this segment are of the pine forests of Central Georgia. Aside from two gravel mines owned by Vulcan Materials Company, the route encounter little else until reaching a traffic circle with Georgia State Route 18 (Dames Ferry Road). Roughly  later, it makes a slight curve to the northwest and then runs along the east bank of Lake Juliette, although most of the lake is hidden from the road with pine trees.  A park owned by Georgia Power called the "Dames Ferry Public Use Area at Lake Juliette" can also be spotted. After running under a railroad bridge, it encounters the entrance to the Plant Scherer Steam Power Plant. Later it passes by a manufacturing company specializing in erosion control products called ErosionTech just before entering the western edges of Juliette. At the 4-way stop intersection with the road for which the community was named, which is also a blinker-light intersection, a local convenience store can be found on the northwest corner, and the southwest corner has a homemade sign leading to the "Whistle Stop Café," the site of the filming of the 1991 movie "Fried Green Tomatoes." North of there, the road has few landmarks other than the Juliette Baptist Church, and the Elbert L. Jackson Memorial Bridge over the Towaliga River. Practically every other intersection in this segment is a dead end street, until it reaches another blinker-light intersection with a four-way stop at Georgia State Route 83. Just after the gas station on the northeast corner of this intersection is a local street named Lower Martin Road, and further up, the intersection with another dirt road named Berner Loop, closely followed by Martin Road on the opposite side. The culvert over Lee Creek is barely visible, as are the driveways to an antenna and one common driveway nearby. These are what passes for landmarks before US 23/SR 87 intersects Watson and Mount Pleasant Church Roads (Monroe CR 88), and then just 200 feet away Lassiter Road.

The bridge over Big Sandy Creek is where US 23/SR 87 enters Butts County, and after running beneath a power line right-of-way, the segment runs through forestland below ground level, cut like a sunken trace. Very few intersections and residencies exist after this segment. The road enters the Flovilla City Limits just south of the first intersection of Beaty Circle and Floyd Street. An abandoned section of Lamar Street branches off to the northeast before the intersection with Lee Street which leads to the local post office. The next intersection that follows is the second intersection with Beaty Circle and Beaty Street which is also a blinker-light intersection. US 23 becomes a divided highway again before the intersection with Higgins Road, but instantly approaches an at-grade interchange with Georgia State Route 42, replacing SR 87 as the overlapping state route as SR 87 comes to an end. US 23/SR 42 continues northwest in the same trajectory, and ceases to remain a divided highway north of Watkins Road. A railroad line that US 23 previously ran above when it crossed the bridge over the Ocmulgee River in Macon is encountered again when it approaches the road on the east side, only to curve away and cross a private dirt road named McCoy Road that terminates at the routes. The highway begins to curve in a more westerly direction and the forestland begins to thin out as it runs under some power lines running southwest to northeast between a barbeque restaurant and a self-storage warehouse. Another set of power lines running directly west to east can be found between two dirt roads named Rodeo Drive and Valley Hills Road.

Jackson through Atlanta
Right after a gas station/pawn shop, US 23/42 officially enters Jackson. The railroad line that US 23 ran over when it crossed the bridge in Macon is encountered again at the intersection with Eighth Street. The road curves away from the tracks and then back near the intersections with Indian Springs Street and then Railroad Street, then curves away from them again as it approaches Georgia Route 16 and joins it in another concurrency along East Third Street heading west. At the intersection with Covington Street and College Street, the routes are also joined by SR 36 until they reach Mulberry Street at the historic Butts County Courthouse. SR 16 continues west onto West Third Street, while US 23/SR 42 makes a right turn to the north-northwest onto Brookwood Avenue. The route approaches the same railroad line it flanked north of Flovilla, and curves to the northwest along the west side of those tracks. Just south of Old Bethel Road it moves away from the side of the tracks, and curves more towards the west again before entering Jenkinsburg, where that same railroad line now runs along the north side of the road. Along the way, it passes by a Scotts mulch mill and the local post office. After Sihloh Road it turns southwest, but curves back towards the northwest again at the intersection with County Line Road and McGough Road where it obviously crosses the Butts-Henry County line. Here the road is named "State Route 42" and varies between two and three lanes. At some point within the county the routes enter Locust Grove. The road runs close to the southwest side of the previously mentioned railroad line across from South Singley Drive (which at one time crossed the tracks), then again across from Beulah Lane and Southridge Drive, and once again east of Grove Road, remaining along that side. The road and the railroad track curve more toward the northwest between LG Griffin and Indian Creek Roads, but on the opposite side of the tracks approaches the Locust Grove Recreational Center, and then the NRHP-listed Locust Grove Institute Academic Building, on the southwest corner of Bill Gardner Parkway. Before the intersection with South Gardner Lane and North Jackson Street the tracks move away from the road, which itself passes through an industrial zone. North of Bethlehem Road, US 23/SR 42 climbs an embankment for a bridge over the railroad line it frequently encountered, and now runs along the east side of those tracks. The road moves away from the tracks at an industrial cul-de-sac, and then passes by a self-storage warehouse that  has a former jet fighter used as a sign. Further north after the intersection with King Mill Road, it gains the name Macon Street and passes by a pair of now closed warehouses.

Just after crossing a culvert over a tributary of Tusshaw Creek and entering the McDonough City Limits, US 23/SR 42 has an intersection with SR 155. After another signalized intersection, this time with a local street named Racetrack Road, the routes split into a one-way pair with northbound traffic remaining along Macon Street, and southbound traffic running along Griffin Street, just south of the McDonough Memorial Cemetery on Macon Street. Sites along this segment also include the McDonough Municipal Courthouse, the Shiloh Baptist Church, the First United Methodist Church of McDonough, the NRHP-listed Brown House. Both streets enter the McDonough Historic District where they encounter another one-way pair with SR 20/81, the westbound segment of this having a one-block overlap with southbound US 23/SR 42. The north side of this district, as well as the rest of McDonough Square is dominated by the Henry County Courthouse, which runs along westbound SR 20/81 and spans between northbound and southbound US 23. The northbound street enters the Lawrenceville Street Historic District when the street the district was named for briefly joins it for one block, then branches off to the northeast across from Maxwell Street and the street name resumes as Macon Street. Meanwhile, southbound US 23 is named Atlanta Avenue north of McDonough Square. Macon Street and then Atlanta Street curve to the northwest, as the one way pair ends at the historic James and Bertha Hooten House. North of there, the road is only a two-lane undivided highway, though it widens briefly at a cluster development named North Valley and the Huntington Ridge Housing Development which leads to the McDonough Children's Specialists Hospital. US 23/SR 42 intersects the unfinished and unmarked McDonough Parkway before finally leaving the city limits at the bridge over Walnut Creek, although many businesses north of there are still are addressed as being in McDonough. Among these businesses are some churches, a veterinary hospital, and a treatment center for traumatic brain injuries. The road becomes a four lane divided highway before approaching the intersection with Eagles Landing and East Lake Parkways. After a Henry County Fire Station, it narrows down to two lanes before approaching a power line right-of-way and a bridge over Little Cotton Indian Creek, and later curves toward the north. A former right of way for the road curves to the northwest while US 23/SR 42 curves straight north to approach Georgia State Route 138, and runs in a westbound overlap with this route. From here, the road is named North Henry Boulevard and is entirely four lanes with a continuous center-left turn lane as it enters Stockbridge. Just west of the Stockbridge City Hall and former site of the Walden-Turner House, US 23/SRs 42/138 runs above a bridge over the same railroad line it encountered near Flovilla, Jackson, and Locust Grove. Gradually curving to the northwest, SR 138 leaves US 23/SR 42 as the routes curve back north again then runs along the east side of Interstate 675 until making another brief curve to the west and enters Clayton County where the name changes from Henry Boulevard to Macon Highway, and has a diamond interchange with that interstate in Rex at Exit 2, only to curve back to the north and run along the west side for the rest of its journey.

The name of the road changes from Macon Highway to Moreland Avenue, as it passes over a culvert for Tar Creek and enters Ellenwood, and the first signalized intersection just happens to be Rex Road, which leads to the Historic Rex Village. North of Forest Parkway US 23/SR 42 eventually runs along the eastern edge of the former site of Fort Gillem. Housing within the former base has been converted into a local housing development. After the intersection of Old Toney Road it passes under a two-lane bridge for an abandoned railroad spur to the base. The Main Gate to Fort Gillem can be found across from Anvil Block Road, the southeast corner of which includes a warehouse for the YRC Worldwide affiliated trucking company called USF Holland. This company is the beginning of an industrial trend along the routes. North of two automotive repair shops US 23/42 enters Conley. Within the community, an extraordinarily large number of trucking companies, and related businesses are gathered around or near US 23, even as that and SR 42 cross the DeKalb County line, where the name Moreland Avenue continues. Within this segment, the road serves as the northeastern terminus of SR 54 Conn. (formerly Georgia State Route 160). After passing more truck, bus, and construction related businesses on the west side and the Hickory Ridge Landfill on the east side, the road encounters Interstate 285 at Exit 53, which also has ramps leading back to I-675. Even with the proximity of the Lake Charlotte Nature Preserve, truck-related businesses continue to run alongside US 23 as it enters Atlanta. Along the city limit and then fully within the city of Atlanta, it runs for several miles in a perfectly straight and due north/south line, which is also the Fulton/DeKalb county line.

Along this segment the road runs over a railroad bridge, and then passes by the Moreland Flea Market, and later the Chestnut Hill Cemetery and Starlight Six Drive-In Theatre just before the southeastern terminus of Spur Route 42. The cluster of trucking related businesses finally ends at Custer Avenue Southeast, and is replaced by more general commercial development. North of East Confederate Avenue, US 23/SR 42 runs along the neighborhood line between Ormewood Park-East Atlanta and commercial development along the routes is replaced by residential development until it reaches Delaware Avenue, where the commercial zoning resumes. Residencies are restored again between Hall Street Southeast and Portland Avenue Southeast.  The next block is the Western terminus of Georgia State Route 260 and shortly afterwards the unmarked section of Glenwood Avenue Southeast, diagonally across from there. Commercial development remains along the road as it approaches Interstate 20 at Exit 60 where it crosses the East Atlanta–Edgewood neighborhood line, more accurately running along the Reynoldstown-Edgewood line when it instantly encounters Georgia State Route 154. Between Arkwright Place and Wylie Street, the road runs through some residencies that are raised above ground by stone embankments. North of Hardee Street Northeast, the road becomes a divided highway, as it approaches a bridge under a railroad freight line shared by the MARTA Blue and Green Lines east of Inman Park / Reynoldstown (MARTA station). From there, the route runs between Inman Park, Atlanta and Candler Park briefly passing through the Little Five Points area, but then runs along the eastern edge of Poncey-Highland, where it encounters the eastern terminus of SR 42 Conn., which was originally intended to be part of the Stone Mountain Freeway. On the Poncey-Highland–Atkins Park neighborhood line, US 23 turns east on US 29-78-278/SR 8-10 (Ponce de Leon Avenue), while SR 42 continues north along Briarcliff Road.

Atlanta through Buford

South Ponce de Leon Avenue immediately splits off to the southeast, but US 23/29/78/278 only runs along the main Ponce de Leon Avenue along the northern edges of Springdale Park, Virgilee Park, and Brightwood Park, while South Ponce de Leon runs along the south side of these parks. This pattern ends at Lullwater and Fairview Roads, but is repeated again shortly afterwards at Shady Side Park and Dellwood Park, where the routes enter Druid Hills. On the opposite side, a North Ponce de Leon Avenue runs along the northern edge of Deepdene Park while US 23/29/78/SR 8 runs along the south side of that park, but US 278/SR 10 branches off to the southeast towards East Lake, Kensington, I-20 from Lithonia to Covington, and ultimately to Hilton Head Island in South Carolina, only for North Ponce de Leon Avenue to reunite with its parent street. After crossing under a stone arch railroad bridge and entering Decatur, Ponce de Leon Avenue becomes a local street, while US 23/29/78/SR 8 branches off to the northeast onto Scott Boulevard. This concurrency comes to an end when US 29/78/SR 8 encounters Georgia State Route 155 (Clairemont Avenue), and US 23 makes a left turn onto that street. Entering North Decatur the street name changes to Clairmont Road and eventually approaches Interstate 85 at Exit 91, where US 23/SR 155 crosses into the Brookhaven City Line. The routes curve to the northeast then SR 155 ends at Georgia State Route 13, but US 23 turns right onto Buford Highway. Clairmont Road continues north as an unmarked route toward SR 141 in Chamblee. Along the way, US 23/SR 13 passes along the southern border of DeKalb Peachtree Airport, although Clairmont Road runs along the western edge of that airport, providing direct access to it. Entering Doraville, the route encounters Interstate 285 again at Exit 32 just north of the Tom Moreland Interchange.

US 23/SR 13 crosses the Gwinnett County line after Johnson Drive and enters Mechanicsville, where it approaches the south side of a major Southern Railway line leading between Atlanta and Charlotte, North Carolina. US 23/SR 13 runs parralell to the Railroad through Norcross, Duluth, Suwanee, Sugar Hill, and Buford where US 23 turns on to SR 20, while SR 13 continues northeast to SR 369 in Gainesville. US 23 overlaps SR 20 as another four-lane divided highway, this time with random unfinished frontage roads. Though signed eastbound while US 23 is signed northbound, it actually runs southeast and winds through the landscape descending as it approaches a bridge over Suwanee Creek then climbs a hill as it approaches the interchange with I-985 (SR 365) at Exit 4, where it finally turns left onto the northbound on-ramp, joining that route in another concurrency eventually crossing the Gwinnett-Hall County line.

Hall County to North Carolina

The first interchange along I-985/US 23/SR 365 in Hall County is Exit 8 at Georgia State Route 347. Though signed only for Sprout Springs Road, the Rankin Smith Interchange (Exit 12) in Flowery Branch also includes Phil Niekro Boulevard. Former rest areas also exists west of Exit 16 (SR 53), which is so close to Exit 17 (SR&13), that southwest-bound ramps are separated by a frontage road, and the northeast-bound on-ramp from Exit 16 goes over the northeast-bound off-ramp from Exit 17. Within Gainesville, US 129 once again joins the concurrency at Exit 22 which is also shared by the southern terminus of US BUS 129. At Exit 24 US 129 leaves across from the unmarked Old Cornelia Highway, and I-985 ends. However, the US 23/SR 365 concurrency continues north as an at-grade highway that has potential to be upgraded to interstate standards. Signage was missing from Buford Highway north (at turn onto SR 20), but returned at the controlled access end of I-985, continuing north on SR 365 also known as Cornelia Highway.

This segment of US 23/SR 365 is an example of an unfinished freeway. Various intersections and features embankments along the sides of the road resemble the potential for an upgrade of the road to limited-access highway. Among the more important though not necessarily designated routes intersecting this segment are White Sulphur Road which connects the communities of White Sulphur to the north and White Sulphur Springs to the south. The next community it runs near is Lula where it intersects Georgia State Route 52, a west-east state highway spanning from Dalton to Maysville. Beyond this point it continues to run up and down the hills of Hall County passing through more minor intersections. As the road crosses the Hall-Habersham County line, it gains the name Tommy Irwin Parkway. The first intersection in the county is Yonah Post Road in Raoul and most other minor intersections beyond that point are minor, including those north of Alto and the northwestern edges of Baldwin, the latter of which also includes a more important intersection, specifically the southern terminus of Georgia State Route 384 which continues south as an unmarked local street name Duncan Bridge Road. After the intersection with Kudzu Hill Road, the road enters Cornelia, passing a bridge over J. Warren Road with no access. One last diamond interchanges can be found just before a wye interchange with US 441 becomes the beginning of a concurrency that exists through the North Carolina state line as far north as Dillsboro. In the process, it also rejoins SR 15.

The first crossing along the US 23/441 multiplex is the interchange with US BUS 441, which is also known as "Old Historic US 441," running south into Baldwin and north through Demorest and Clarkesville. Most intersections from that point on are strictly local street built at grade, however a single connecting ramp from both directions of US 23/441 runs down to the southwest corner of the bridge over the southern terminus of SR 197. Crossing three more local intersections, the routes enter Mount Airy, where SR 365 leaves at a flyover interchange with US 123 and directly afterwards US 23/441/SR 15 has an intersection with SR 17. Winding north through Mount Airy, the north end of BUS 441 is encountered again, across from SR 17 Alt., although historic US 441 still runs along the west side as an unmarked route. Later the road passes through Turnerville, but encounters no routed intersections. Unmarked Historic US 441 ends just before the routes passes through Tallulah Falls, where they intersect another former section that is marked as Georgia State Route 15 Loop on the east side which is a scenic overlook for the falls.Shortly afterward the road enters Tallulah Gorge State Park  before entering Rabun County.

Here, the road briefly leaves the park and runs along the side of it as it passes by the former namesake station for the Tallulah Falls Railway then crosses over the Riley C. Thurmond Memorial Bridge before reentering the park. From there it passes through the Blue Ridge Mountain communities of Wiley, Lakemont, and Tiger, the divider comes to an end and US 23/441/SR 15 remains undivided through the rest of the state with either three or four lanes as it enters Clayton. Beginning here, it is primarily a four-lane undivided highway, In Clayton it meets US 76/SR 2. US23/441 then continues north through Mountain City, Rabun Gap, and Dillard before  crossing into North Carolina, and SR 15 comes to an end.

National Highway System
The following portions of US 23 in Georgia is part of the National Highway System, a system of routes determined to be the most important for the nation's economy, mobility, and defense:
The entire concurrency with US 1/SR 4 from the Florida state line to a point north of Alma
The entire concurrency with US 341/SR 27 from Hazlehurst to Eastman
From the intersection with SR 87 Conn. in East Macon to SR 247 in Macon
A small portion in Woodhaven Estates and Stockbridge
The entire length between the I-285 interchanges, from south of Constitution to Doraville
From the northern end of the SR 13 concurrency (on the Sugar Hill–Buford line) to the North Carolina state line.

Major intersections

Business routes

See also
 
 
 Special routes of U.S. Route 23

References

External links

 Georgia @ SouthEastRoads - U.S. Highway 23
  US 23 (Georgia Highways)
 US 23 in Georgia (Mile by Mile)
 GDOT Official Website

 
23
Transportation in Charlton County, Georgia
Transportation in Ware County, Georgia
Transportation in Bacon County, Georgia
Transportation in Appling County, Georgia
Transportation in Jeff Davis County, Georgia
Transportation in Dodge County, Georgia
Transportation in Bleckley County, Georgia
Transportation in Twiggs County, Georgia
Transportation in Bibb County, Georgia
Transportation in Monroe County, Georgia
Transportation in Butts County, Georgia
Transportation in Henry County, Georgia
Transportation in Clayton County, Georgia
Transportation in DeKalb County, Georgia
Transportation in Fulton County, Georgia
Transportation in Gwinnett County, Georgia
Transportation in Hall County, Georgia
Transportation in Habersham County, Georgia
Transportation in Rabun County, Georgia